The College of Liberal Arts (CLA) of De La Salle University, formerly known as the College of Arts and Sciences was founded in 1918. In 1982, the College of Arts and Sciences was split into two colleges, the College of Liberal Arts, and the College of Science. The CLA provides Lasallians with a liberal education enough to develop the student in humanities and the social sciences. The college is now the most populous in the university, following the split of the College of Business and Economics into the College of Business and the School of Economics in 2010. The CLA Administration is located in 2nd floor of the Miguel Hall. The Departments of Literature and English are both recognized by the Commission on Higher Education as Centers of Excellence.

Academic departments of the CLA
Behavioral Sciences
Communication
Filipino
History
International Studies
Literature
Philosophy
Political Science
Psychology
Theology and Religious Education

Degree offerings

Undergraduate Degree Programs

AB in Behavioral Sciences major in Organizational and Social Systems Development
AB in Communication Arts
AB in Development Studies
AB in History
AB in International Studies major in American Studies
AB in International Studies major in Chinese Studies
AB in International Studies major in European Studies
AB in International Studies major in Japanese Studies
AB in Literature
AB in Organizational Communication
AB in Philippine Studies major in Filipino in Mass Media
AB in Philosophy
AB in Political Science
AB in Psychology
AB in Sports Studies
BS in Psychology
Bachelor of Arts and BS in Commerce (AB-BSC or LIA-COM Program), major from any of the AB major fields, combined with any of the following Commerce degrees:
BS in Accountancy
BS in Advertising Management
BS in Applied Corporate Management
BS in Business Management
BS in Entrepreneurship
BS in Legal Management
BS in Management of Financial Institutions
BS in Marketing Management

Graduate Degree Programs

Doctor of Arts in Language and Literature major in English 
Doctor of Arts in Language and Literature major in Filipino 
Doctor of Arts in Language and Literature major in Literature 
Doctor of Philosophy in Applied Theology  
Doctor of Philosophy in Development Studies 
Doctor of Philosophy in Filipino majors in Language and Literature
Doctor of Philosophy in Literature 
Doctor of Philosophy in Philosophy 
Master of Arts in Applied Behavioral Sciences 
Master of Arts in Applied Theology (Thesis/Non-Thesis Program) 
Master of Arts in Communication major in Applied Media Studies 
Master of Arts in Development Policy 
Master of Arts in Education major in Religious and Values Education 
Master of Arts in History (Thesis/Non-Thesis Program) 
Master of Arts in International Studies major in European Studies  
Master of Arts in Language and Literature major in Filipino 
Master of Arts in Language and Literature major in Literature 
Master of Arts in Philippine Studies 
Master of Arts in Political Science
Master of Arts in Religious Education 
Master of Arts in Religious Formation
Master of Arts major in Japanese Studies 
Master of Education major in Religious Values Education with Specialization in Formative Counseling 
Master of Education major in Religious and Values Education 
Master of Fine Arts major in Creative Writing 
Master of Health in Social Science 
Master of History/Political Science 
Master of Science in Psychology major in Applied Social and Cultural Psychology
Master of Science in Psychology major in Clinical Psychology 
Master of Science in Psychology major in Human Development Psychology 
Master of Science in Psychology major in Industrial Psychology
Master of Science in Psychology major in Organizational Psychology
Master of Science in Psychology major in Psychological Measurement 
Master of Science in Psychology major in Social Cultural Psychology 
Master of Philosophy

Certificate and Diploma Programs
Certificate in Teaching Religion  
Diploma in Applied Theology

Notable alumni
Ryan Agoncillo - host, Philippine Idol; main cast in Krystala, Ysabella, Kasal, Kasali, Kasalo, and played a cameo role in Ouija
Shaira Luna - Mensa-certified genius; former TV host & Dep-Ed Youth Representative; professional freelance photographer
Edu Manzano - Chairman, Optical Media Board; Host, Game Ka Na Ba and The Weakest Link; film and television actor; radio commentator at DZMM
Kitchie Nadal - band vocalist; commercial model
Vitaliano N. Nañagas III - former Chairman, Development Bank of the Philippines; former President, Social Security System of the Philippines
Ambeth Ocampo - Director, National Historical Institute, Republic of the Philippines
Rufus Rodriguez - Member, House of Representatives of the Philippines; former Commissioner of the Bureau of Immigration and Deportation; former Dean, San Sebastian College - Recoletos College of Law; former lead counsel of former President Joseph Estrada, Senator Loren Legarda, and 2004 Presidential candidate Fernando Poe Jr.
Gary Valenciano - concert performer, composer, and producer

Notes

Liberal arts colleges in the Philippines
De La Salle University